Hatem Ghaeb  is a Syrian football defender who played for Syria in the 1996 Asian Cup.

Early life
Ghaeb was born 1967 in Al-Asharah, Deir ez-Zor Governorate, which indicates to age fabrication, to enable him to participate in the youth tournaments, as he was registered as born on 25 September 1971.

He studied law at the Damascus University.

Career
Ghaeb played his entire career for Al-Shorta from 1987 to 2000. He played for Syria U20 in the 1990 AFC Youth Championship and 1991 FIFA World Youth Championship. 

In December 2019, Ghaeb was voted to be the Chairman of the Syrian Arab Federation for Football.

See also
List of one-club men

References

External links

11v11.com

Syrian footballers
Living people
1971 births
Association football defenders
Al-Shorta Damascus players
People from Deir ez-Zor Governorate
Damascus University alumni
Syrian Premier League players
Syria international footballers